Red Robin Records  was a record label that began in 1951 as "Robin Records" in New York City.  Owner  Bobby Robinson was unaware that another company was already using the name "Robin" and after about four releases  was  forced to change to "Red Robin" to avoid litigation.  Robinson also opened Fury Records in late 1956 and Fire Records in 1959.

External links
 Red Robin discography

See also
 List of record labels

Record labels established in 1951
Defunct record labels of the United States
1951 establishments in New York City